Lords of Misrule may refer to:

 Lords of Misrule, an 1976 novel by Nigel Tranter
 "Lords of Misrule" a short story in the Viriconium series by M. John Harrison
 Lords of Misrule (comics), a series of comics by a number of authors including John Tomlinson
 "The Lords of Misrule", a short story by Dana Cameron
 Lords of Misrule: Mardi Gras and the Politics of Race in New Orleans, a book by James Gill
 The Lords of Misrule: Poems 1992-2002, a book by X. J. Kennedy

See also
Lord of Misrule, from which the phrase is derived